Olive Dorothy Paschke RRC, (19 July 1905 – 15 February 1942) was an Australian army nurse who died in World War II.

Early life
Olive Dorothy Paschke was born at Dimboola, Victoria, the daughter of Heinrich Wilhelm Paschke and Ottilie Emma Kreig Paschke. Both of her parents were born in Australia. Her father was a farmer and a station agent. Olive Paschke earned her nursing certificate at Queen Victoria Memorial Hospital for Women and Children in Melbourne. She also held certificates in midwifery and infectious disease nursing.

Career
Paschke worked as a hospital matron at Dimboola for four years, then in Melbourne at the Jessie McPherson Community Hospital. She joined the Australian Army Nursing Service in 1940, at age 35. She was posted to Malaya, to establish the 2nd/10th Australian General Hospital, in early 1941. In 1942 she was sent to Singapore to help convert a school into a 200-bed hospital. Soon her unit was converting nearby buildings and treating up to 600 patients at a time. Paschke was recognized with the Royal Red Cross award in January 1942.

In February 1942, Paschke and Irene Melville Drummond were the matrons supervising 63 nurses when all of them were sent back to Australia on a ship carrying hundreds of women and children, the SS Vyner Brooke. The ship was struck by a bomb in the Bangka Strait. Paschke's life raft never reached land, and all its passengers were considered lost at sea, presumed drowned. Twenty-two of Paschke's colleagues, Australian nurses who reached land following the bombing of the Vyner Brooke, were executed by Japanese soldiers in the Bangka Island massacre.

Posthumous honours

Paschke was awarded the Florence Nightingale Medal by the International Red Cross Committee in 1951. The Matron Paschke Memorial Sundial at her alma mater in Dimboola was dedicated in 1949. Paschke's name is inscribed on the Kranji War Memorial in Singapore.

Pashke Place in the Canberra suburb of Chisholm is named in her honour.

References

External links
 Another photograph of Olive Dorothy Plaschke, from the Australian War Memorial.

1905 births
1942 deaths
Australian women nurses
Australian military nurses
People from Victoria (Australia)
Members of the Royal Red Cross
Florence Nightingale Medal recipients
20th-century Australian women
Australian Army personnel of World War II
Australian Army officers
Australian military personnel killed in World War II